Psycho Bunny is a privately held men's clothing company founded in 2005 with offices in its founding city of New York and headquarters in Montreal. The retailer is known for its reimagined classic menswear, including its trademark 4,000 stitch bunny-embroidered polos.

Alen Brandman of Thread Collective Inc., an originating brand licensee,  purchased 100 percent of the operating rights and 50 percent of the intellectual property rights in 2017. In 2021, Brandman acquired full ownership of Psycho Bunny, then in 2022, formed a leadership group along private investment firm BBRC, led by retail executive Brett Blundy, and Bertrand Cesvet, the former CEO and chairman of Sid Lee.

In the past two years Psycho Bunny has tripled its business. By the end of 2022, the brand will have more than 100 stores globally.

References 

Clothing manufacturers